Detective Boomrah is a fictional detective created by Indian storyteller Sudhanshu Rai. The genre of stories featuring Detective Boomrah is usually suspenseful and thriller. Detective Boomrah first surfaced in the seven-minute-long mystery, and has since appeared in over 50 Sudhanshu stories. Sudhanshu Rai also made a web series titled “Detective Boomrah” based on this popular character.

Character’s biography 

Unlike other traditional detectives, Boomrah takes up cases that are supernatural, paranormal and beyond the realms of reality. He is a suave, social young man, who does not don a deerstalker nor does he smoke a pipe.

Other most popular stories by Detective Boomrah include The Killer, Horror of the Nuambi Village, The Mysterious Mrs Macbethy, The Missing Mr Kwatrochi and The Invisible Man, among others.

Web series 

Sudhanshu has directed a web series titled Detective Boomrah wherein he also played the titular role. The first episode of the series was premiered on YouTube on January 21, 2022, following which the first season of the series comprising three episodes was released on MX Player.

Stories 

 The Missing Mr Kwatrochi
 The Ghost Man
 The Invisible Man
 Horror of the Nuambi Village
 The Killer
 The Missing Hour
 The Dark House
 The End of the World

References 

Fictional paranormal investigators
Fictional detectives